Hanamapur may refer to any of the following villages in India:

 Hanamapur (557449), Gokak taluk, Belagavi district, Karnataka 
 Hanamapur (557483), Gokak taluk, Belagavi district, Karnataka
 Hanamapur, Athni taluk, Belagavi district, Karnataka
 Hanamapur (S.U.), Ramdurg taluk, Belagavi district, Karnataka
 Hanamapur, Dharwad district, Karnataka
 Hanamapur, Haveri district, Karnataka